Cocos Lagoon appears as a small incomplete coral atoll attached to the south-western coast of Guam near the area of the village of Merizo.

Cocos Island and Babe Island sit atop the southern portion of the Merizo Barrier Reef and separate Cocos Lagoon from the open ocean in the south. In the east, Cocos Lagoon is separated from Achang Reef by narrow Manell Channel that leads to Achang Bay. In the north-west, Mamaon Channel separates Cocos Lagoon from the main island of Guam and allows boat access to Merizo. Southeastward of the channel, down to Achang Bay, there is no separation to the main island of Guam. Along the west side, the barrier reef uncovers in spots but has no islands.

See also
Fofos
List of rivers of Guam
List of lakes in Guam

Further reading
National Centers for Coastal Ocean Science

Bibliography
The Island of Guam By Leonard Martin Cox
Bendure, G. & Friary, N. (1988) Micronesia:A travel survival kit. South Yarra, VIC: Lonely Planet.

References

Lakes of Guam